Heritage Christian Academy is the name of several private Christian schools in the United States and Canada:

 Heritage Christian Academy (Calgary)
 Heritage Christian Academy (Fort Collins, Colorado)
 Heritage Christian Academy (Texas)
 Heritage Christian Academy (Kansas)
 Heritage Christian Academy (Minnesota)
 Heritage Christian Academy (New Jersey)